Central Signal Village is one of the 28 barangays of Taguig, Metro Manila, Philippines.

References

External links
Official Facebook page of Barangay Central Signal, Taguig

Taguig
Barangays of Metro Manila